Torma may refer to:

Torma, Tibetan Buddhist ritual offering cake

Places
Torma Parish, rural municipality in Jõgeva County, Estonia
Torma, Estonia, small borough in Torma Parish, Jõgeva County, Estonia
Tõrma (disambiguation), name of several places in Estonia
Törmä, village in Keminmaa, Lapland, Finland

People
Anna Torma (born 1952), Hungarian-Canadian fibre artist
August Torma (1895–1971), Estonian military officer, minister and diplomat
Gábor Torma (born 1976), Hungarian football player
Julien Torma (1902–1933), French writer, playwright and poet
Július Torma (1922–1991), Czechoslovakian boxer
Zsófia Torma (1832–1899), Hungarian archaeologist, anthropologist and paleontologist

Hungarian-language surnames